MuscleTech  is a brand of dietary supplements, marketed by Iovate Health Sciences Inc., which includes Hydroxycut. It was owned by Canadian company Kerr Holdings which was acquired by the Xiwang Foodstuffs Company, a Chinese company, for $584 million in 2016.

History
In 1998, MuscleTech launched Cell-Tech, a creatine-carbohydrate-alpha lipoic acid supplement.

In December 2015, a settlement was reached that applies to protein shakes and beverages that include MuscleTech.

In September 2018, Muscletech is partnering up to Rob Gronkowski to create a high-protein candy bar. In October 2018, MuscleTech partnered with Homes For Our Troops.

In April 2019, MuscleTech had partnered up with Tough Mudder. In July 2019, MuscleTech launched the Prime Series, a private label sports nutrition line exclusive to Amazon.

In May 2020, a MuscleTech product made in the U.S. was linked to a death in Spain. 

MuscleTech's brand ambassadors include actor Henry Cavill, U.S. marathoner Ryan Hall, swimsuit model Camille Kostek, and figure skater Gracie Gold.

In April 2021, MuscleTech is announced the addition of a new general manager. MuscleTech, through its parent company Iovate Health Sciences, is a partner of the Metabolism & Sports Science Lab at the University of Toronto.

In February 2022, MuscleTech announced they are looking for their next Brand Superstar. In April 2022, a lawsuit was filed alleging containers of MuscleTech powder supplements were sold half empty.

References

External links 
 Official website

Sports nutrition and bodybuilding supplement companies